The 2015–16 Miami Hurricanes men's basketball team represented the University of Miami during the 2015–16 NCAA Division I men's basketball season. The Hurricanes were members of the Atlantic Coast Conference (ACC). They were led by fifth year head coach Jim Larrañaga and played their home games at the BankUnited Center on the university's campus in Coral Gables, Florida. They finished the season 27–8, 13–5 in ACC play to finish in a tie for second place. They defeated Virginia Tech in the quarterfinals of the ACC tournament to advance to the semifinals where they lost to Virginia. They received an at-large bid to the NCAA tournament where they defeated Buffalo and Wichita State to advance to the Sweet Sixteen where they lost to Villanova.

Previous season

The Hurricanes finished the season 25–13, 10–8 in ACC play to finish to finish in a tie for sixth place. They advanced to the quarterfinals of the ACC tournament where they lost to Notre Dame. They were invited to the National Invitation Tournament where they defeated North Carolina Central, Alabama, Richmond and Clemson to advanced to the NIT championship game where they lost to Stanford.

Departures

Incoming transfers

2015 recruiting class

Roster

Schedule and results

|-
!colspan=12 style="background:#005030; color:white;"| Exhibition

|-
!colspan=12 style="background:#005030; color:white;"| Non-conference Regular Season

|-
!colspan=12 style="background:#005030; color:white;"| ACC Regular Season

|-
!colspan=12 style="background:#005030;"| ACC tournament

|-
!colspan=12 style="background:#005030;"| NCAA tournament
|-

Rankings

References

Miami Hurricanes men's basketball seasons
Miami
Miami Hurricanes men's basketball team
Miami Hurricanes men's basketball team
Miami